Rural Party may refer to:

Eastern Rural Party, short-lived political party in Bolivia
Finnish Rural Party
Focus NZ, political party in New Zealand, formerly NZ Rural Party
Rural Alliance Party, a political party in the Solomon Islands originally known as the Rural Party
Rural Development Party in Papua New Guinea
Rural Party (Iceland)
Rural Party (UK), a former political party in the United Kingdom

See also
List of agrarian parties